"The Hunt" is episode 84 of the American television anthology series The Twilight Zone. It originally aired on January 26, 1962 on CBS.

Opening narration

Plot
Hyder Simpson is an elderly mountain man who lives with his wife Rachel and his coon dog Rip in the backwoods. Rachel does not like having the dog indoors, but Rip saved Hyder's life once and Hyder refuses to part with him. Rachel has seen some bad omens recently and warns Hyder not to go raccoon hunting that night. When Rip dives into a pond after a raccoon, Hyder jumps in after him. Only the raccoon comes up out of the water. The next morning, Hyder and Rip wake up next to the pond. When they return home, Hyder finds that Rachel, the preacher, and the neighbors cannot hear or see him, and are tending to the burial of both him and Rip.

Walking along the road, Hyder and Rip encounter an unfamiliar fence and follow it. They come to a gate tended by a man, who explains that Hyder can enter the Elysian Fields of the afterlife. Told that Rip cannot enter and will be taken to a special afterlife for dogs, Hyder angrily declines the offer of entry and decides to keep walking along the "Eternity Road," saying, "Any place that's too high-falutin' for Rip is too fancy for me."

Later, Hyder and Rip stop to rest and are met by a young man, who introduces himself as an angel dispatched to find them and take them to Heaven. When Hyder recounts his previous encounter, the angel tells him that gate is actually the entrance to Hell. The gatekeeper had stopped Rip from entering because Rip would have smelled the brimstone inside and warned Hyder that something was wrong. The angel says, "You see, Mr. Simpson, a man, well, he'll walk right into Hell with both eyes open. But even the Devil can't fool a dog!" As the angel leads Hyder along the Eternity Road toward Heaven, he tells Hyder that a square dance and raccoon hunt are scheduled for that night. He also assures Hyder that Rachel, who will soon be coming along the road, will not be misled into entering Hell.

Closing narration

Cast
 Arthur Hunnicutt as Hyder Simpson
 Jeanette Nolan as Rachel Simpson
 Titus Moede as Wesley Miller
 Orville Sherman as Tillman Miller
 Charles Seel as Reverend Wood
 Robert Foulk as Gatekeeper
 Dexter Dupont as Angel

Production
The plot is based on a 1953 episode of The Kate Smith Hour, "The Hound of Heaven", which was written by Hamner.

See also
 Coon hound
 Key Underwood Coon Dog Memorial Graveyard
 Rainbow Bridge (pets)
Where the Red Fern Grows, children's novel and two film adaptations.

References

 Zicree, Marc Scott. The Twilight Zone Companion, Bantam Books, 1982. 
 DeVoe, Bill. (2008). Trivia from The Twilight Zone. Albany, Georgia: Bear Manor Media. 
 Grams, Martin. (2008). The Twilight Zone: Unlocking the Door to a Television Classic. Churchville, Maryland: OTR Publishing.

External links

 The Hunt (complete "radio" episode on YouTube)
 The Hound of Heaven (complete episode on YouTube)

1962 American television episodes
Afterlife places
Animal cemeteries
Animals in religion
Animals and humans
Dogs in religion
Dog monuments
Hunting in popular culture
Television episodes about the afterlife
The Twilight Zone (1959 TV series season 3) episodes